Green Christmas may refer to: 

 "Green Christmas" (Barenaked Ladies song), a song by the Barenaked Ladies from the How the Grinch Stole Christmas film soundtrack
 "Green Christmas" (Stan Freberg song), a piece of audio theater written and performed by Stan Freberg and Daws Butler
 Green Christmas Festival, an annual rock festival in Estonia
 A Christmas with no snow on the ground, the opposite of a White Christmas